Anthony Dumartheray (born 2 August 1988) is a Swiss male badminton player.

Achievements

BWF International Challenge/Series
Mixed Doubles

 BWF International Challenge tournament
 BWF International Series tournament
 BWF Future Series tournament

References

External links 

Living people
1988 births
Swiss male badminton players